3-O-alpha-D-glucosyl-L-rhamnose phosphorylase (cphy1019 (gene)) is an enzyme with systematic name 3-O-alpha-D-glucopyranosyl-L-rhamnopyranose:phosphate beta-D-glucosyltransferase. This enzyme catalyses the following chemical reaction

 3-O-alpha-D-glucopyranosyl-L-rhamnopyranose + phosphate  L-rhamnopyranose + beta-D-glucose 1-phosphate

In the reverse phosphorolysis reaction the enzyme is specific for L-rhamnose as acceptor and beta-D-glucose 1-phosphate as donor.

References

External links 
 

EC 2.4.1